Euphaedra viridirupta is a butterfly in the family Nymphalidae. It is found in Ivory Coast, Ghana, Nigeria and Cameroon.

References

Butterflies described in 2007
viridirupta